Maddigan's Quest is a fantasy-based television series set in a post-apocalyptic future. It was based on an original concept by Margaret Mahy and was developed for television by Rachel Lang and Gavin Strawhan. The show originally screened on BBC1 in the UK, and was also aired on TV3 in New Zealand and the Nine Network in Australia in early 2006.

Storyline 
Early in the 22nd century, the world underwent a vast and rapid change. The tectonic plates of the Earth began to shift and rapidly changed the face of the planet. Since then, the events of this time have grown to be known as the time of the Great Shift or the Great Chaos- and have become myth and legend. As a result of these events, the population of Earth severely dropped and little remained of the old ways. While some forms of old technology exist, the ways of man have receded. Slavery is not uncommon, bandits roam the highways.

Maddigan's Quest follows the circus troupe 'Maddigan's Fantasia', who come from the city of Solis, a beacon of freedom and peace for the desolate world. Each year, the Fantasia leave Solis to perform and earn a living, but this year is different: they have been set the task of obtaining a new Solar Converter to replace the existing converter–the only power source in Solis–which is failing. At the centre of this quest is 14-year-old Garland, the last member of the Maddigan family line.

Near the beginning of the Fantasia's journey, just after Ferdy Maddigan, the group's leader and Garland's father, is killed, two boys and their baby sister appear from the future. But while the younger brother, Eden, seems to be a blessing to the performers with his illusionary skills, his older brother Timon is hiding a dark secret which threatens the Fantasia, their mission, and the future of Solis itself.

Cast and characters

Main 
 Rose McIver as Garland
 Jordan Metcalfe as Timon
 Zac Fox as Eden
 Olivia Tennet as Lilith
 Rawiri Pene as Boomer
 Danielle Cormack as Maddie, Garland's mother
 Tim Balme as Yves
 Rachel House as Goneril
 Hori Ahipene as Tane
 Mark Nua as Bannister
 Peter Daube as Ozul
 Michael Hurst as Maska
 Ben Cooper as Nye
 Bronwyn Baker as Byrna
 Grace Brannigan as Jewel

Recurring 
 Fleur Saville as Silver Girl
 Jack Campbell as Ferdy Maddigan, Garland's father
 Ross Duncan as The Nennog

Guest 
 Geraldine Brophy as Ida
 Tandi Wright as Timon's mother
 Shane Cortese as Timon's father
 Patrick Wilson as Mayor of Gramth
 Alison Bruce as Witch finder
 Milo Cawthorne as Bolek
 Sara Wiseman as Morag
 Ilona Rodgers as Gabrielle
 John Leigh as Harold
 Reuben de Jong as Edgar
 Tom Hern as Birdboy leader

Episodes

Home releases

Awards and nominations

Science Fiction and Fantasy Association of New Zealand

Screen Directors Guild of New Zealand

Book 
Maddigan's Fantasia, later re-released under the title Maddigan's Quest, is a novel written by Margaret Mahy as a tie-in for the TV series (based on her concept).

The circus troupe Maddigan's Fantasia are on a mission to get a new solar converter from Newton for their hometown Solis. But on the way there, the Fantasia meet two strange boys, Timon and Eden. They are from the future and have come to help the Fantasia change history: in their timeline, when the Fantasia did not get back to Solis in time, the council gave up on them and took a new path, a radiation path. Timon and Eden's parents were killed because an evil monster called the Nennog rules Solis in the future and their parents tried to work out a way to change the past. They created a time slider, but they were killed for it, so Timon and Eden did the job for them and then they saved the Fantasia and Solis was saved.

References

External links 
  at South Pacific Pictures
  at Burberry Productions
 
 

2000s British children's television series
2006 Australian television series debuts
2006 Australian television series endings
2006 British television series debuts
2006 British television series endings
2006 New Zealand television series debuts
2006 New Zealand television series endings
Australian children's fantasy television series
BBC children's television shows
English-language television shows
New Zealand children's television series
New Zealand fantasy television series
Post-apocalyptic television series
Television shows funded by NZ on Air
Television series by South Pacific Pictures
Three (TV channel) original programming
Television series by All3Media